The American Blackbelly is a breed of domestic sheep that originated in the United States.

The breed was developed in Texas by crossing Barbados Black Belly sheep with Rambouillet sheep and mouflon. This produced a horned animal with a heavier carcase and increased muscle mass compared to the original black-bellied breed.

American Blackbellies are mainly used for trophy hunting.

References